The Mayor of Kalawao County is the chief executive officer of Kalawao County in the U.S. state of Hawaii. Kalawao County, which lacks a local government, is administered by the Hawaii Department of Health. Under Hawaii state law, the Director of the Hawaii Department of Health, who is appointed by the Governor of Hawaii, simultaneously serves as the Mayor of Kalawao County while in office. The Mayor of Kalawao County holds executive powers similar to other elected Hawaiian mayors, including the responsibilities of health, public safety, and law and order. The Mayor appoints a county sheriff selected from Kalawao County residents.  The Mayor visits Kalawao several times a year to meet with local residents.  Kalawao County, which is located on the Kalaupapa Peninsula on the north coast of Moloka'i, consists of three villages - Kalaupapa, Kalawao, and Waikolu.

Former Kalawao County Mayor (and State Health Director) Bruce Anderson enacted a smoking ban in all Kalawao County public buildings on October 4, 2002.

Former Hawaii Health Director and Kalawao Mayor Loretta Fuddy, who had served in both offices from 2011 to 2013, died in a plane crash on December 11, 2013, shortly after takeoff from Kalaupapa Airport. Fuddy had traveled to Kalawao County earlier in the day to attend an annual meeting with the county's Hansen's disease patients as part of her duties as mayor.

References